Begusarai Assembly constituency is an assembly constituency in Begusarai district in the Indian state of Bihar. In 2015 Bihar Legislative Assembly election, Begusarai was one of the 36 seats to have VVPAT enabled electronic voting machines.

Overview
As per Delimitation of Parliamentary and Assembly constituencies Order, 2008, No. 146 Begusarai Assembly constituency is composed of the following: Begusarai municipality; Birpur community development block; Babhangama, Maida Babhangama, Sahuri, Neenga and Bathauli gram panchayats of Barauni CD Block; Mohanpur, Chandpura, Bandwar, Suja, Sankh, Lakho, Hebatpur, Parna,
Kusmaut, Kaith, Jinedpur, Neema, Panhas, Ajhaur, Khamhar and Rajaura gram panchayats of Begusarai CD Block. 

Begusarai Assembly constituency is part of No. 24 Begusarai (Lok Sabha constituency).

Members of Legislative Assembly

Election results

2020

2015

References

External links
 

Assembly constituencies of Bihar
Politics of Begusarai district
Begusarai